Harrisburg Area Roller Derby (HARD) is a women's flat track roller derby league based in Harrisburg, Pennsylvania. Founded in 2005, as of 2017 it has a single team, which competes against teams from other leagues. Harrisburg Area Roller Derby is a member of the Women's Flat Track Derby Association (WFTDA).

History
The league was founded by a group of women in January 2005.  By early 2007, it had played three bouts, and was attracting crowds of several hundred people.  

The league joined the Women's Flat Track Derby Association (WFTDA) in May 2008.  It qualified for the 2009 WFTDA Eastern Regional Tournament, but was unable to field a team.  By 2010, it had grown to more than forty skaters.

The current head coach is Roxie Riot and the current Head Official is Registered Curse.

WFTDA rankings

References

Women's Flat Track Derby Association Division 3
Roller derby leagues established in 2005
Roller derby leagues in Pennsylvania
Sports in Harrisburg, Pennsylvania
2005 establishments in Pennsylvania